Ginetta G40 Junior may refer to:
 Ginetta G40, a racing car.
 Ginetta Junior Championship, an auto racing series for the Ginetta G40